W41AP channel 41 was an analog low-power television station in Sandusky, Ohio. The station was owned by Sandusky Newspapers, Inc., the former publishers of the Sandusky Register, the local newspaper.

W41AP's license was cancelled by the Federal Communications Commission on May 31, 2019 after SNI's sale to Ogden Newspapers, which had no interest in programming a television station.

External links
FCC Application for DW41AP

Television stations in Ohio
Television channels and stations established in 1990
Defunct television stations in the United States
Television channels and stations disestablished in 2019
1990 establishments in Ohio
2019 disestablishments in Ohio
41AP